American Falcon  was an Argentinian airline based in Buenos Aires. The airline began operations in 1996 and shut down in 2005. It operated largely domestic services, but also some international routes to South American cities.

History 
The airline was formed in 1995 and initially offered only charter services, though it gradually introduced scheduled flights.

In 2003, the airline embarked on a major expansion after the closure of Líneas Aéreas Privadas Argentinas and Dinar Líneas Aéreas, investing US$4 million in new routes and aircraft.

On 1 March 2004, due to rising fuel costs, the airline announced it was ending all operations within a week. It completely shut down a year later.

Fleet 
The airline operated a maximum of five aircraft after its 2003 expansion—three Boeing 737-200s and two Fokker F28s. Shortly before it ended operations, it returned one of the Fokkers to the lessor.

See also 
 List of defunct airlines of South America

References

Defunct airlines of Argentina
Airlines established in 1995
Airlines disestablished in 2005
2005 disestablishments in Argentina
Argentine companies established in 1995